The 2015 Judo Grand Prix Jeju was held in Jeju City, South Korea from 26 to 28 November 2015.

Medal summary

Men's events

Women's events

Source Results

Medal table

References

External links
 

2015 IJF World Tour
2015 Judo Grand Prix
Judo competitions in South Korea
Judo